Gase is a surname. Notable people with the surname include:

Abigail Gase (born 2002), American Paralympic swimmer 
Adam Gase (born 1978), American football coach 
Joey Gase (born 1993), American stock car racing driver

See also
List of populated places in the Tibet Autonomous Region#G
GaSe, the chemical formula of gallium(II) selenide